The 1956 World Fencing Championships were held in London, England, United Kingdom. The championships were for non-Olympic events only.

Medal table

Medal summary

Women's events

References 

 FIE Results

World Fencing Championships
Fencing
World Fencing Championships
International fencing competitions hosted by the United Kingdom
World Fencing Championships
World Fencing Championships